SKN most commonly refers to Saint Kitts and Nevis

It can also refer to:

Sports teams
SKN FC Kebumen, an Indonesian association football team
SKN St. Pölten, an Austrian association football team
SKN St. Pölten (basketball), an Austrian basketball team
SKN St. Pölten (women), an Austrian women's football team

Transport
Shan King (North) stop, Hong Kong, MTR station code
Sri Krishna Nagar railway station, Uttar Pradesh, India, Indian railways code
St Keyne Wishing Well Halt railway station, England, National Rail code
Stokmarknes Airport, Skagen, Norway, IATA code

Other uses
Sri Karan Narendra Agriculture University, Rajasthan, India